Deep Sea Arcade is a psychedelic Indie rock band from Sydney, Australia.

The group began as a home recording project for founding members, Nic McKenzie (lead singer, songwriter, lyricist) and Nick Weaver (bass, guitar) while in their mid-teens, using four-track tape recorders, broadcast microphones, analog synths and unconventional computer programs.

Their debut album Outlands, received a worldwide release in 2012 through Ivy League Records, with singles heavily supported in Australia by Triple J (Feature Album) and FBi Radio (Feature Album), in the UK by BBC 1, BBC Radio 6, and XFM, in America by KROQ and KCRW, and in Europe by 3FM.

The band have played sold-out tours across venues in Australia's major cities, as well as having a spot on Australiaʼs Big Day Out festival, the band toured with Noel Gallagher's High Flying Birds, Spoon, Temples, The Charlatans, Girls, Kaiser Chiefs, Cloud Control and Modest Mouse. They also toured the UK and Europe extensively, including appearances at Lowlands Festival (Netherlands), Wilderness Festival (UK), Secret Garden Party (UK) Primavera Sound Festival (Spain), Reeperbahn Festival (Germany), Live at Leeds (UK) Liverpool Sound City (UK) The Great Escape (UK), and sold-out headline shows in the UK.

In 2013, Deep Sea Arcade signed to Australian music veteran, Michael Chugg's newest business division, Chugg Music, joining a roster of Australian talent including Megan Washington, Sheppard, The Griswolds and Major Leagues.

"Deep Sea Arcade are one of the best bands in Australia, and we're very excited to be working with them, along with the rest of our Chugg Music roster," Chugg said. "They have been selling out shows all over Europe and playing the biggest festivals. It won't be long before the whole world knows them and we're pretty excited to be a part of it."

Upon returning to Australia, the band also started Sydney-based club night VISIONS, inspired by DIY events curated by bands like The Horrors and The Black Angels

As of 6 October 2018, Deep Sea Arcade went dark on all social media. Their website, Twitter and Facebook were all showing black, signifying an announcement for their second album. On 26 October, Blacklight was released. McKenzie called the album "a fusion of soul, electronic and disco".

In 2021, Nick Weaver died of bowel cancer at the age of 37.

Members
 Nic McKenzie – lead vocals/synthesizer;

touring members
Nic McKenzie – lead vocals/synthesizer;
Brendan O' Mahony – synthesizer;
Mason Lewtas – bass;
Rob Turner – drums;

Former Members
 Nick Weaver – guitar.

former touring members
Mody Grant – guitar (2013–2016)
James Booker – bass (2013–2016)
Xavier Diekman – drums (2013–2016)
Simon Relf – guitar (2010–2013)
Carlos Adura – drums (2010–2013)
Tim Chamberlain – guitar (2010–2013)

Performances

Festivals

En Orbita Festival – Santiago, Chile (2018);
Pulsar – Santiago, Chile (2018);
Fluvial – Valdivia, Chile (2018);
Big Sound – Brisbane, Australia (2014);
FBI Turns 10 – Sydney, Australia (2013);
Lowlands Festival – Biddinghuizen, Netherlands (2013);
Noorderzon Festival – Groningen, Netherlands (2013);
Big Day Out – Australia (2013);
Peats Ridge Festival, Glenworth Valley, NSW, Australia (2012);
Reeperbahn Festival – Hamburg, Germany (2012);
San Miguel Primavera Sound – Barcelona, Spain (2011);
The Great Escape Festival – Brighton, UK (2011);
Peats Ridge Festival – Glenworth Valley, NSW, Australia (2010).

International tours
Blacklight South American Tour(2018);
Embassy Tour Abu Dhabi (2016);
Granite City Tour – England, Germany, France, Belgium (2013);
Outlands Tour – Switzerland, Germany, France, Belgium (2012);
Girls Tour – England (2011);
Lonely in Your Arms 7" Tour – Spain, England (2011);

National tours
Learning To Fly Tour – October 2016;
Spoon Tour – February 2015;
Black Cat Tour – September 2013;
Granite City Tour – November 2012;
Outlands Album Tour – June 2012;
Girls Single Tour – November 2011;
Co-headline with Surf City – February 2011.

Discography

Albums
 Blacklight (26 October 2018, Universal Music Australia).
 Outlands (vinyl) (19 June 2012, Microfiche Records);
 Outlands (16 March 2012, Ivy League Records);

Singles/EPs
 "Close To Me" (12 Oct 2018, Universal Music Australia);
 "Outlaw" (17 Aug 2018, Universal Music Australia);
 "Learning To Fly" (11 Oct 2016, Chugg Music);
 "Seen No Right" (30 May 2012, Ivy League Records);
 "Steam" (13 February 2012, Ivy League Records);
 "Girls" (26 September 2011, Ivy League Records);
 Don't Be Sorry EP (2010).

References

Australian indie rock groups